Ulf Peter Apelgren (born 13 February 1959 in Johanneberg, Gothenburg Municipality) is a Swedish artist and comedian. He is married to Anna Mannheimer.

Apelgren has worked at Sveriges Radio P3. As comedian he is well known for improvising his humour, which he does in the programs. In 2005 he made the Christmas show Cabaretfantomen på taket at Trädgårn Restaurant in Gothenburg. He has appeared in the humour program Lycka till broadcast by Kanal Lokal Göteborg.

He appeared at the opening of the 2006 European Athletics Championships where he showed his own picture on Pablo Picasso.

Apelgren and Hélène Benno won På spåret 2010/2011.

References

External links
Peter Apelgren - Nöjestorget 
Peter Apelgren - Talarforum

1959 births
Living people
People from Gothenburg
20th-century Swedish artists
Swedish comedians